Borislav Vujadinović (born 9 September 1959) is a Bosnian bobsledder. He competed at the 1984, 1988 and the 1992 Winter Olympics, representing Yugoslavia.

Career results

Olympic Games

References

1959 births
Living people
Yugoslav male bobsledders
Bosnia and Herzegovina male bobsledders
Olympic bobsledders of Yugoslavia
Bobsledders at the 1984 Winter Olympics
Bobsledders at the 1988 Winter Olympics
Bobsledders at the 1992 Winter Olympics
Sportspeople from Nevesinje